Carmylessus or Karmylessos was a town of ancient Lycia, described by Strabo between Telmissus and the mouth of the Xanthus. After Telmissus, he says, then Anticragus, an abrupt mountain on which is the small place Carmylessus, lying in a ravine.

The editors of the Barrington Atlas of the Greek and Roman World identify Kaya, Fethiye as the location of the ancient city, while the Lund University Atlas of the Roman World tentatively place it at Kayaköy.

References

Populated places in ancient Lycia
Ancient Greek archaeological sites in Turkey
Former populated places in Turkey